Santa Cruz is a barrio in the municipality of Carolina, Puerto Rico. According to the 2010 Census, its population in that year was 1,927.

History
Puerto Rico was ceded by Spain in the aftermath of the Spanish–American War under the terms of the Treaty of Paris of 1898 and became an unincorporated territory of the United States. In 1899, the United States Department of War conducted a census of Puerto Rico finding that the population of Santa Cruz barrio was 435.

See also

 List of communities in Puerto Rico

References

Barrios of Carolina, Puerto Rico